Zidani Most railway station is an important railway station and junction in Zidani Most, which is located within the municipality of Laško, Slovenia. The station lies close to the confluence of the Sava and Savinja Rivers.  Its importance is because most non-direct train services linking the east with Ljubljana connect here.

Gallery

External links 

Official site of the Slovenian railways (in English)

Railway stations in Slovenia
Municipality of Laško